Shayne Gauthier (born February 20, 1992) is a professional Canadian football linebacker for the Winnipeg Blue Bombers of the Canadian Football League (CFL). He is a Grey Cup champion after winning with the Blue Bombers in the 107th Grey Cup game. He played CIS football for the Laval Rouge et Or from 2012 to 2015 where he won two Vanier Cup championships in 2012 and 2013.

Professional career
Gauthier was drafted 28th overall in the fourth round of the 2016 CFL Draft by the Blue Bombers and signed with the team on May 20, 2016. Following training camp, he made the team's active roster and played in his first professional football game on June 24, 2016, against the Montreal Alouettes where he recorded one special teams tackle. Over the course of his career, he has primarily been a special teams player for the Blue Bombers. During the 2019 West Division Final against the Saskatchewan Roughriders, with the Blue Bombers leading 20–13 in the fourth quarter, Gauthier made a shoestring tackle to save a touchdown during a trick punt return. Winnipeg closed out the game by the same score and the Blue Bombers advanced to the 107th Grey Cup. In the Grey Cup game that year, Gauthier recorded one special teams tackle as the Blue Bombers ended a 29-year championship drought in the victory over the Hamilton Tiger-Cats.

On January 8, 2021, Gauthier signed a one-year contract extension to remain with the Blue Bombers.

References

External links
Winnipeg Blue Bombers bio

1992 births
Living people
Canadian football linebackers
Players of Canadian football from Quebec
Laval Rouge et Or football players
Winnipeg Blue Bombers players